Okan Yılmaz (born 16 May 1978) is a Turkish professional footballer.

Early life and career
Yılmaz started playing football for Karayollari Yolspor in 1988. His professional career began in İnegölspor when he was signed up in 1996. Two years later, in 1998, he was transferred to Bursaspor. Yılmaz spent the brunt of his career at the Bursa-based club, leading the Süper Lig in goals scored twice (2001 and 2003). He was courted by CSKA Moscow and Olympique de Marseille in 2003. A transfer fee from l'OM was accepted by Bursaspor, but Yılmaz didn't agree to the contracts terms.

International career
Yılmaz started his international career with the Turkey U-21 squad in 2000. He was promoted to the senior squad in 2003, but has not been called up since 2004. He has five goals in eight caps, as well as a third-place finish in the 2003 FIFA Confederations Cup. In the semi-final v France, Yilmaz had the opportunity to equalise with a penalty, but missed, and consequently, Turkey lost 3-2, and went to the third place playoff.

Honours
Turkey
FIFA Confederations Cup 2003 third place: 2003

Individual
Süper Lig top goalscorer: 2001, 2003
TFF First League top goalscorer: 2005

Career statistics

Club
(Correct as of 15 May 2010)

International
(Correct as of 15 May 2010)

(Correct as of 15 May 2010)

|}

References

External links

1978 births
Living people
Turkish footballers
Turkey international footballers
2003 FIFA Confederations Cup players
Turkish expatriate footballers
Turkish expatriate sportspeople in Greece
İnegölspor footballers
Bursaspor footballers
Malatyaspor footballers
Konyaspor footballers
Sakaryaspor footballers
Diyarbakırspor footballers
Orduspor footballers
Vanspor footballers
Süper Lig players
Panthrakikos F.C. players
Association football forwards
Turkey under-21 international footballers
Expatriate footballers in Greece